NR Vulpeculae is a red supergiant and irregular variable star in the constellation Vulpecula. It has an effective temperature around 4,000 K, a radius of 553 times larger than the sun, which means that if it were in the place of the Sun, its surface would reach beyond Mars's orbit. Consequently, NR Vulpeculae is also a luminous star, radiating 111,000 - 223,000 times as much energy as the sun.  It is considered a likely member of the Vulpecula OB1 stellar association.

References

Vulpecula
M-type supergiants
K-type supergiants
J19501193+2455240
IRAS catalogue objects
339034
BD+24 390
Slow irregular variables
Vulpeculae, NR